George Edward Lopez (born April 23, 1961) is an American stand-up comedian and actor. He is known for starring in his self-produced ABC sitcom. His stand-up comedy examines race and ethnic relations, including Mexican American culture. Lopez has received several honors for his work and contributions to the Latino community, including the 2003 Imagen Vision Award, the 2003 Latino Spirit Award for Excellence in Television and the National Hispanic Media Coalition Impact Award. He was also named one of "The Top 25 Hispanics in America" by Time magazine in 2005.

Early life
Lopez was born on April 23, 1961, in Mission Hills, Los Angeles, California, the son of Frieda and Anatasio Lopez, a migrant worker. He is of Mexican descent. He was deserted by his father when he was two months old and by his mother when he was 10 years old, but was raised by his maternal grandmother, Benita Gutierrez, a factory worker, and step-grandfather, Refugio Gutierrez, a construction worker. Lopez attended San Fernando High School, graduating in 1979.

Career

Television

In 2000, after several years of performing stand-up comedy, Lopez was approached by actress Sandra Bullock for Lopez to produce and star in a comedy. Bullock was concerned about the lack of Hispanic-oriented sitcoms on American television and pushed to get a sitcom on television that starred Hispanics without being exclusively about the Hispanic American community. Long criticized by Hispanic American groups for lack of Latinos on their television shows, ABC quickly picked up the television series. In 2002, Lopez became one of the few Latinos to star in a television comedy series, following in the footsteps of Desi Arnaz, Freddie Prinze, and John Leguizamo. George Lopez is an American situation comedy that originally aired on ABC from 2002 to 2007. Lopez is the co-creator, writer, producer, and star of the show.

On March 8, 2007, it was announced that George Lopez would join the Nick at Nite lineup. It first aired on Nick at Nite on September 10, 2007. On May 15, 2007, ABC announced that the series would be canceled after its sixth season. The show last aired on ABC September 7, 2007. The show also entered syndication in the fall of 2007. Never a big Nielsen hit in prime-time, the show became a surprise success in syndication.

After receiving the news that his show was canceled in 2007, Lopez criticized president of ABC Entertainment Steve McPherson for using racially motivated reasons for his decision. The actor told the Los Angeles Times that "TV just became really, really white again", and lashed out against ABC by saying, "So a chicano can't be on TV, but a caveman can?" in reference to the short-lived sitcom Cavemen, which was replacing George Lopez on the schedule. Cavemen garnered a sharply negative reception from critics and viewers, and was canceled after 13 episodes. Lopez blamed ABC for causing over a hundred of his show's staff to become jobless.

Lopez was a cast member and commentator for HBO's hit sports show Inside the NFL for the 2003–04 football season.

Lopez guest-starred as the mayor of Reno, Nevada, in season five of Reno 911! in 2008.

On March 28, 2009, it was announced that Lopez would be hosting his own late-night talk show on TBS. Lopez hosted a late-night talk show entitled Lopez Tonight on TBS Monday through Thursday at midnight Eastern Time. The show debuted in November 2009. In November 2010, the show moved back to midnight ET to accommodate a new show with former Tonight Show host Conan O'Brien. Although O'Brien had reservations about the move and initially refused TBS's offer, Lopez supported and even advocated for it, making it different from the 2010 Tonight Show conflict that saw O'Brien depart NBC after a proposal to push Tonight back 30 minutes for Jay Leno to return to the 11:35 p.m. slot. On August 10, 2011, Lopez received a cancellation notice from TBS. The network decided not to renew Lopez Tonight for a third season.

On April 18, 2013, it was announced that Lopez would be starring in his own sitcom on FX called Saint George, which premiered on March 6, 2014. Saint George was produced under Debmar-Mercury and Lionsgate Television's syndication model, which states that if a show hits certain ratings thresholds in its first 10-episode run, it triggers an additional 90-episode order. Failing to do so, Saint George was canceled on June 25, 2014, after one season.

In August 2015, TV Land announced a straight-to-series order for Lopez, a semi-autobiographical single-camera sitcom, which debuted on March 30, 2016.

Lopez was invited to be a guest judge on America's Got Talent in 2016. He was allowed to use his golden buzzer once, which made an act go straight to the live shows. He used his on the dance group Malevo.

In May 2022, NBC picked up  Lopez's new series, "Lopez vs Lopez", where he co-stars opposite of his daughter, Mayan.

Film

Lopez's HBO Films drama Real Women Have Curves premiered at the Sundance Film Festival, where it received the 2002 Audience Award. Previously, Lopez was featured in the 2000 drama Bread and Roses. He starred in the ABC Wonderful World of Disney Christmas film Naughty or Nice, and he appeared in the Robert Rodriguez-directed film The Adventures of Sharkboy and Lavagirl in 3-D (2005).

Brown is The New Green: George Lopez and the American Dream is a 2007 documentary directed and produced by Phillip Rodriguez.

In 2010, Lopez appeared in The Spy Next Door with Jackie Chan, starring as a villain named Glaze. The following year Lopez reprised his role as Papi for Beverly Hills Chihuahua 2, and was the voice of a toco toucan, Rafael, in the animated box-office hit Rio, alongside Jesse Eisenberg, Anne Hathaway, will.i.am, and Jamie Foxx. In 2019, he played the role of Captain Gomez in the independent film El Chicano.

Books
Lopez's autobiography Why You Crying was published by the Touchstone/Fireside division of Simon & Schuster, and placed in The New York Times bestsellers top twenty. The book is co-written by Armen Keteyian.

Other work
In January 2009, Lopez appeared in We Are One: The Obama Inaugural Celebration at the Lincoln Memorial.

He is a two-time host of the Latin Grammy Awards, and a co-host of the Emmy Awards.

Personal life
In 1993, Lopez married Ann Serrano. The couple has a daughter, Mayan, born in 1996. On September 27, 2010, Lopez announced that he and his wife had decided to end their marriage. Serrano filed for divorce on November 23, 2010, citing "irreconcilable differences". The divorce was finalized on July 1, 2011.

Lopez has a genetic condition that caused his kidneys to deteriorate. His doctors had told him in April 2004 that he was going to require an organ transplant but he postponed the operation until finishing the fourth season of George Lopez. In 2005, his wife Ann donated one of her kidneys to Lopez. The transplant was successful; Lopez lost  after the operation due in part to the improvement in his health. He brought awareness to the issue on his show; his character's son Max was diagnosed with a similar illness.

Lopez endorsed Senator Bernie Sanders for President in the 2016 U.S. presidential election.

Lopez owns a house in Los Feliz, Los Angeles.

Though he was raised Catholic, he is not religious, though he does believe in God and "the biblical themes of 'faith and love'".

Charity work and honors

Lopez was a featured celebrity golfer in the 2004 Bob Hope Chrysler Classic and the 2004 AT&T Pebble Beach National Pro-Am. Lopez and his pro partner finished third in the Pebble Beach event. George was the top-ranking celebrity at completion of the tournament. Since 2006, Lopez has served as host of the Bob Hope Chrysler Classic. He is a member at Lakeside Country Club in Burbank, California, and has a 13 handicap.

A native of Los Angeles who grew up in the San Fernando Valley's Mission Hills, Lopez devotes much time to the community. He heads his own charity, The Ann & George Lopez Foundation (www.thelopezfoundation.org). He is a recipient of the Manny Mota Foundation Community Spirit Award and was named Honorary Mayor of Los Angeles for his extensive fund-raising efforts benefiting earthquake victims in El Salvador and Guatemala. In February 2004, Lopez was presented the 2004 Artist of the Year and Humanitarian Award by the Harvard Foundation at Harvard University, presented by its president and dean for his artistic work and charitable endeavors.

Lopez has received several honors for his work and contributions to the Latino community. In September 2004, George was honored with the "Spirit of Liberty Award", presented by People for the American Way. In August 2005, Time magazine recognized George as one of "The 25 Most Influential Hispanics in America". On October 18, 2011, Lopez's elementary school, San Fernando Elementary School, honored him for his beneficent efforts by naming their auditorium after him. Lopez has ensured through his annual toy giveaway that every child at the school receives a gift during the holidays.

Filmography

Film

Television

Accolades

References

External links

 
 
 
  – PBS

1961 births
American male actors of Mexican descent
American male film actors
American male television actors
American male voice actors
American stand-up comedians
American television personalities of Mexican descent
Hispanic and Latino American male actors
Living people
Male actors from California
Kidney transplant recipients
People from Mission Hills, Los Angeles
San Fernando High School alumni
20th-century American male actors
21st-century American male actors
Comedians from California
20th-century American comedians
21st-century American comedians
Las Vegas shows
People from Los Feliz, Los Angeles
Former Roman Catholics